George Bourne (8 September 1875 – 10 March 1924) was a New Zealand photographer who worked for the Auckland Weekly News for over twenty years. He was considered a pioneer of press photography. Bourne was also known for his work with Māori portraiture and was the first European to be invited into the home of the Maori prophet Rua Kenana in 1908. Bourne was an adventurous photographer and travelled extensively throughout New Zealand during his time with the Auckland Weekly News. He photographed the Urewera region after the New Zealand Wars and in 1917 captured the eruption of the volcano Mount Ngauruhoe. In 1909 his first montage for the Auckland Weekly News was published and in 1920 Bourne took photos of the Walsh Brothers Flying School, becoming the one of the first in the Southern Hemisphere to experiment with aerial photography.

References

External links 
Works by Bourne held in the collection of Auckland War Memorial Museum.

New Zealand photographers
Artists from Whanganui
New Zealand photojournalists
1875 births
1924 deaths
People associated with the Auckland War Memorial Museum